Dianne Carol Hansford (born 1964) is an American computer scientist known for her research on Coons patches in computer graphics and for her textbooks on computer-aided geometric design, linear algebra, and the mathematics behind scientific visualization. She is a lecturer at Arizona State University in the School of Computing and Augmented Intelligence, and the cofounder of a startup based on her research, 3D Compression Technologies.

Education and career
Hansford is a 1986 graduate of the University of Utah. She went to Arizona State University for graduate study, earning a master's degree in 1988 and completing her Ph.D. in 1991. Her dissertation, Boundary Curves with Quadric Precision for a Tangent, Continuous Scattered Data Interpolant, was supervised by Robert E. Barnhill.

She became a Fulbright Scholar in German, doing postdoctoral research at the Technical University Darmstadt, and then worked in the computing industry for several years, including co-founding 3D Compression Technologies in 2000, before returning to Arizona State as a research scientist in 2004. She became an associate research professor in 2006 and a lecturer in computing in 2016.

Selected publications
Hansford's books, coauthored with Arizona State University professor Gerald Farin, include:
The Geometry Toolbox for Graphics and Modeling (A K Peters, 1998); revised as Practical Linear Algebra: A Geometry Toolbox (A K Peters, 2005; 4th ed., CRC Press, 2021)
The Essentials of CAGD (CRC Press, 2000)
Mathematical Principles for Scientific Computing and Visualization (A K Peters, 2008)

She is also the author of a highly cited paper on Coons patches:

References

External links
Home page

1964 births
Living people
American computer scientists
American women computer scientists
University of Utah alumni
Arizona State University alumni
Arizona State University faculty